Leading Ladies can refer to:

Leading Ladies (film)
Leading Ladies, a theatrical comedy play by Ken Ludwig.
Leading Ladies (group), a musical super-group (signed to East West Records/Warner Music Group) consisting of members Amber Riley, Beverley Knight and Cassidy Janson.
 Leading Ladies (podcast) Zambian podcast on historical women.